The Science Masters series is a book series of short, non-mathematical books for a general audience
written by scientists known for their popular writings. It was created by the literary agent John Brockman in the 1990s, and originally published by Basic Books.

Books include:

 The Origin of the Universe by John D. Barrow
 The Last Three Minutes by Paul Davies
 The Origin of Humankind by Richard Leakey
 How Brains Think by William H. Calvin
 The Periodic Kingdom by P.W. Atkins
 The Human Brain: A Guided Tour by Susan Adele Greenfield
 Just Six Numbers: The Deep Forces That Shape the Universe by Martin J. Rees
 Kinds of Minds by Daniel C. Dennett
 Laboratory Earth: The Planetary Gamble We Can't Afford to Lose by Stephen H. Schneider
 Nature's Numbers by Ian Stewart
 One Renegade Cell: The Origins of Cancer by Robert A. Weinberg
 Symbiotic Planet : A New Look at Evolution by Lynn Margulis
 The Pattern on the Stone: The Simple Ideas That Make Computers Work by Daniel Hillis
 The Pony Fish's Glow: And Other Clues to Plan and Purpose in Nature by George C. Williams (in England as Plan and Purpose In Nature)
 River Out of Eden by Richard Dawkins
 Three Roads to Quantum Gravity by Lee Smolin
 What Evolution Is by Ernst Mayr
 Why Is Sex Fun? The Evolution of Human Sexuality by Jared Diamond
 Words and Rules by Steven Pinker
 The Structure of Evolutionary Theory by Stephen Jay Gould
 Beginning of Time by George Smoot
 Nature's Keepers: The New Science of Nature Management by Stephen Budiansky
 The Sixth Extinction Richard E. Leakey and Roger Lewin
 Twins: Genes, Environment and the Mystery of Human Identity by Lawrence Wright

References

Series of books